Christopher "Chris" Paul Resop (born November 4, 1982) is a former American professional baseball right-handed pitcher. He has since entered a career as a real estate professional.

Early life
Resop graduated from Barron G. Collier High School in 2001.

Professional career

Florida Marlins
Resop, was drafted by the Florida Marlins in the 4th round of the 2001 Major League Baseball draft.

In , Resop made his major league debut.

Los Angeles Angels of Anaheim
He was traded to the Los Angeles Angels of Anaheim for Kevin Gregg on December 20, 2006.

Atlanta Braves
Resop was claimed off waivers by the Atlanta Braves on October 25, 2007.

In an extra-inning game against the Pittsburgh Pirates on April 3, 2008, Resop pitched a third of an inning and allowed two walks in the top of the 10th inning. Manager Bobby Cox then brought in left-handed pitcher Royce Ring to face left-handed batter Adam LaRoche and substituted Resop for Matt Diaz in left field. After Ring struck out LaRoche, Gregor Blanco came in to play left and Resop returned to the mound in place of Ring. He subsequently allowed an RBI single to Xavier Nady and earned the loss as the Pirates won 4–3.

On May 28, Resop was designated for assignment by the Braves. He was later assigned to the Richmond Braves of the International League.

Hanshin Tigers
On July 7, the Braves sold Resop's contract to the Hanshin Tigers of the Japanese Central League.

Return to Braves
Resop re-signed with the Braves prior to the  season.

He was called up on June 15, 2010, after 13 starts in Triple A. In 73.1 innings, he recorded a 1.84 ERA while allowing 46 hits, 27 walks, and striking out 81 batters. He held batters to a .183 average.

Pittsburgh Pirates
On August 4, 2010, Resop was claimed off waivers by the Pittsburgh Pirates.

Oakland Athletics
On November 30, 2012, Resop was traded to the Oakland Athletics for Zach Thornton. He was designated for assignment on May 17, 2013.

Boston Red Sox
Resop signed a minor league deal with the Boston Red Sox in January 2014. On April 1, 2014, he was assigned to AAA Pawtucket Red Sox. He was released on July 1, 2014.

Real estate career
After his retirement from baseball, Resop became involved in the real estate industry, initially working as an agent for William Raveis Real Estate in 2014. In 2017 he helped establish a new division of the company in Naples, Florida. This included a concierge service for professional athletes that are recently traded and new to their team's city. The division was named the Sports + Entertainment Division, and in 2019 Resop became the first official realtor of the Boston Red Sox. He then started his own company The Resop Team, which he runs with his wife Kara. Resop is the company's Managing Director. Later, he became the Managing Partner of The Agency in Naples, Florida, a boutique brokerage specializing in luxury real estate.

References

External links

 | Official website

1982 births
Living people
Major League Baseball pitchers
Florida Marlins players
Los Angeles Angels players
Atlanta Braves players
Pittsburgh Pirates players
Oakland Athletics players
Baseball players from Miami
Sportspeople from Naples, Florida
Utica Blue Sox players
Gulf Coast Marlins players
Greensboro Bats players
Carolina Mudcats players
Albuquerque Isotopes players
Salt Lake Bees players
Richmond Braves players
American expatriate baseball players in Japan
Hanshin Tigers players
Gwinnett Braves players
Mississippi Braves players
Sacramento River Cats players